Alma Township may refer to one of the following places in the US:

 Alma Township, Marion County, Illinois
 Alma Township, Marshall County, Minnesota
 Alma Township, Harlan County, Nebraska

Township name disambiguation pages